MGEN may refer to:
 , a Social security organization in France

MGen or Mgén may refer to :
 Major General, a rank in various Armed Forces

Mgen may refer to :
 Mycoplasma genitalium, a sexually transmitted bacterium